Ravenel may refer to:

Places
Ravenel, Oise, a place in France
Ravenel, South Carolina, United States

Other uses
Ravenel conjectures
Ravenel (surname)